Floyd Haskell (1916–1998), U.S. Senator from Colorado from 1973 to 1979. Senator Haskell may also refer to:

Anne Haskell (born 1943), Maine State Senate
Nathaniel M. Haskell (1912–1983), Maine State Senate
Robert Haskell (1903–1987), Maine State Senate
Will Haskell (born 1996), Connecticut State Senate

See also
Charles C. Hascall (1796–1862), Michigan State Senate
Senator Heiskell (disambiguation)